The Blackbyrds is the debut album by the American rhythm and blues and jazz-funk fusion group the Blackbyrds. It was produced by  Larry Mizell and Donald Byrd with production supervision by Orrin Keepnews.

The album artwork is a section of the Vincent Van Gogh painting Wheatfield With Crows.

Track listing
"Do It, Fluid"  (Donald Byrd)  5:27
"Gut Level"  (Lincoln Ross)  4:08
"Reggins"  (Larry Mizell)  4:05
"The Runaway"  (Donald Byrd, Kevin Toney)  4:13
"Funky Junkie"  (Donald Byrd)  7:01
"Summer Love"  (Allan Barnes)  5:08
"Life Styles"  (Larry Mizell)  3:13
"A Hot Day Today"  (Donald Byrd, Barney Perry)  3:16

Personnel 
 Donald Byrd - Trumpet, Flugelhorn, Vocals
The Blackbyrds - Vocals
Kevin Toney - Keyboards, Melodica, Synthesizer
Joe Hall - Electric Bass
Keith Killgo - Drums
Allan Barnes - Soprano & Tenor Saxophone
David Williams - Bass
Oscar Brashear - Trumpet, Flugelhorn
Perk Jacobs - Percussion
Ray Armando - Percussion

Charts

Album

Singles

References

External links
 The Blackbyrds-The-Blackbyrds at Discogs
 The Blackbyrds-Billboard Albums at AllMusic
 The Blackbyrds-Billboard Singles at AllMusic

1974 debut albums
Fantasy Records albums
The Blackbyrds albums
Soul albums by American artists